The Ministry of Transport is the governmental body of Tanzania with "primary responsibility for Transport Policy, Planning and Coordination functions as well as oversight of Infrastructure delivery and asset management."

References 

T
Tanzania
Transport organisations based in Tanzania